The coat of arms of Puerto Rico was first granted by the Spanish Crown on November 8, 1511, making it the oldest heraldic achievement still currently in use in the Americas. The territory was ceded by Spain to the United States in accordance to the peace treaty that ended the Spanish–American War in 1899, after which two interim arms were adopted briefly. A law was passed in 1905 that reestablished the historical armorial bearings as the arms of the territory. Then in 1976, after numerous investigations and amendments, the current version was adopted.

History

The main element of the coat of arms of Puerto Rico is the Lamb of God. Despite Puerto Rico being a US territory, the shield continues to have elements reminiscent of Spain's presence in the New World. There have been different variations of the coat of arms throughout Puerto Rico's history. The current version was officially readopted by the government of Puerto Rico on 3 June 1976.

On the shield:
 The green background represents the island's vegetation. The Lamb of God and cross flag on the shield are symbols traditionally associated with St. John the Baptist, patron of the island. The book with the seven seals on which the lamb sits represents symbolism from the Book of Revelation, generally attributed to St. John the Apostle.
 The border is made up of 16 different elements: castles and lions to represent the Kingdom of Castile and the Kingdom of León, a flag with the arms of the Crown of Castile and León, and The Cross of Jerusalem to stand for the Kingdom of Jerusalem, whose succession rights passed to the Kingdom of Sicily, and henceforth to the Spanish Crown.
 The gold-crowned F and the arrows represent Ferdinand II of Aragon, while the Y and the yoke represent Ysabel, i.e., Isabella I of Castile who were the Catholic monarchs when Puerto Rico was discovered. It is said, that the "I" on the shield, was in fact a "J" representing Queen "Joanna", commonly known as "Juana La Loca", daughter, and successor of Queen Isabella after she allegedly became mentally ill after the death of her husband, and in whose name her father, as regent of Spain granted the coat of arms to the Spanish territory of San Juan, as Puerto Rico was then known.
 The Latin motto, "JOANNES EST NOMEN EJUS" (a quotation from the Vulgate of Luke 1:63), means "John is his name", referring to St. John the Baptist or San Juan Bautista, the original Spanish name of the island.

Great Seal

All of the states and territories of the United States employ a seal to authenticate and ratify documents and accordingly a seal of Puerto Rico exists, but the traditional coat of arms is used as the main emblem of the territory. The seal has most of the elements of the coat of arms, but the religious elements have been stripped away in accordance with the Separation of church and state in the United States. In the seal, the lamb, which no longer has a halo, carries a white banner instead of one with a Red Cross. The book the lamb sits on does not have the seals of the Book of Revelation. The first Governors used the seal as their emblem but in recent years the usage of the seal has been limited to being the official emblem used to represent Puerto Rico on its legal documents when they are sealed.

Seal of the Governor
The Seal of the Governor is the official symbol of the executive head of Puerto Rico. It follows the design used by the Seal of the President of the United States. There are several variants of the Governor's Seal in use.

Seals of the government of Puerto Rico
There are several seals of the different sections of the Puerto Rican government.

See also

 Flag of Puerto Rico
 Castile and Leon
 Spanish heraldry
 Heraldry

References

Puerto Rico
National symbols of Puerto Rico
Puerto Rico
Puerto Rico
Puerto Rico
Puerto Rico
Puerto Rico
Puerto Rico
Puerto Rico
Puerto Rico
1511 in the Spanish Empire
16th century in Puerto Rico